Newdale may refer to:

Newdale, Idaho
Newdale, Manitoba, a community in Municipality of Harrison Park
Newdale, Shropshire, part of Telford, England